{{DISPLAYTITLE:Histamine H2 receptor}}

H2 receptors are positively coupled to adenylate cyclase via Gs alpha subunit. It is a potent stimulant of cAMP production, which leads to activation of protein kinase A. PKA functions to phosphorylate certain proteins, affecting their activity. The drug betazole is an example of a histamine H2 receptor agonist.

Function 
Histamine is a ubiquitous messenger molecule released from mast cells, enterochromaffin-like cells, and neurons. Its various actions are mediated by histamine receptors H1, H2, H3 and H4. The histamine receptor H2 belongs to the rhodopsin-like family of G protein-coupled receptors. It is an integral membrane protein and stimulates gastric acid secretion. It also regulates gastrointestinal motility and intestinal secretion and is thought to be involved in regulating cell growth and differentiation. Histamine may play a role in penile erection.

Tissue distribution
Histamine H2 receptors are expressed in the following tissues:
Peripheral tissues
Gastric parietal cells (oxyntic cells)
Vascular smooth muscle
Neutrophils
Mast cells
Heart
Uterus

Central nervous system tissues
Caudate–putamen
Cerebral cortex (external layers)
Hippocampal formation
Dentate nucleus of the cerebellum

Physiological responses
Activation of the H2 receptor results in the following physiological responses:

 Stimulation of gastric acid secretion (Target of anti-histaminergics (H2 receptors) for peptic ulcer disease and GERD)
 Smooth muscle relaxation (Experimental  histamine H2 receptor agonist used for asthma and COPD)
 Inhibit antibody synthesis, T-cell proliferation and cytokine production
 Vasodilation – PKA activity causes phosphorylation of MLCK, decreasing its activity, resulting in MLC of myosin being dephosphorylated by MLCP and thus inhibiting contraction. The smooth muscle relaxation leads to vasodilation.
 Inhibition of neutrophil activation and chemotaxis

See also 
 H2-receptor antagonist
 Histamine H1-receptor
 Histamine H3-receptor
 Histamine H4-receptor

References

Further reading

External links 
 
 

Histamine receptors